Haplinis is a genus of South Pacific dwarf spiders that was first described by Eugène Louis Simon in 1894.

Species
 it contains thirty-nine species, found in Australia and New Zealand:
Haplinis abbreviata (Blest, 1979) – New Zealand
Haplinis alticola Blest & Vink, 2002 – New Zealand
Haplinis anomala Blest & Vink, 2003 – New Zealand
Haplinis antipodiana Blest & Vink, 2002 – New Zealand
Haplinis attenuata Blest & Vink, 2002 – New Zealand
Haplinis australis Blest & Vink, 2003 – Australia (Tasmania)
Haplinis banksi (Blest, 1979) – New Zealand
Haplinis brevipes (Blest, 1979) – New Zealand (Chatham Is.)
Haplinis chiltoni (Hogg, 1911) – New Zealand
Haplinis contorta (Blest, 1979) – New Zealand
Haplinis diloris (Urquhart, 1886) – New Zealand
Haplinis dunstani (Blest, 1979) – New Zealand
Haplinis exigua Blest & Vink, 2002 – New Zealand
Haplinis fluviatilis (Blest, 1979) – New Zealand
Haplinis fucatinia (Urquhart, 1894) – New Zealand
Haplinis fulvolineata Blest & Vink, 2002 – New Zealand
Haplinis horningi (Blest, 1979) – New Zealand
Haplinis inexacta (Blest, 1979) – New Zealand
Haplinis innotabilis (Blest, 1979) – New Zealand
Haplinis insignis (Blest, 1979) – New Zealand
Haplinis major (Blest, 1979) – New Zealand
Haplinis marplesi Blest & Vink, 2003 – New Zealand
Haplinis minutissima (Blest, 1979) – New Zealand
Haplinis morainicola Blest & Vink, 2002 – New Zealand
Haplinis mundenia (Urquhart, 1894) – New Zealand
Haplinis paradoxa (Blest, 1979) – New Zealand
Haplinis redacta (Blest, 1979) – New Zealand
Haplinis rufocephala (Urquhart, 1888) – New Zealand
Haplinis rupicola (Blest, 1979) – New Zealand
Haplinis silvicola (Blest, 1979) – New Zealand
Haplinis similis (Blest, 1979) – New Zealand
Haplinis subclathrata Simon, 1894 (type) – New Zealand
Haplinis subdola (O. Pickard-Cambridge, 1880) – New Zealand
Haplinis subtilis Blest & Vink, 2002 – New Zealand
Haplinis taranakii (Blest, 1979) – New Zealand
Haplinis tegulata (Blest, 1979) – New Zealand
Haplinis titan (Blest, 1979) – New Zealand
Haplinis tokaanuae Blest & Vink, 2002 – New Zealand
Haplinis wairarapa Blest & Vink, 2002 – New Zealand

See also
 List of Linyphiidae species (A–H)

References

Araneomorphae genera
Linyphiidae
Spiders of Australia
Spiders of New Zealand